Olessya Atrashkevich is a former road cyclist from Kazakhstan. She represented her nation at the 2007 UCI Road World Championships.

References

External links
 profile at Procyclingstats.com

1988 births
Kazakhstani female cyclists
Living people
Place of birth missing (living people)
20th-century Kazakhstani women
21st-century Kazakhstani women